The Yakovlev Yak-52 is a Soviet primary trainer aircraft which first flew in 1976. It was produced in Romania from 1977 to 1998 by Aerostar, as Iak-52, which gained manufacturing rights under agreement within the former COMECON socialist trade organisation. The Yak-52 was designed as an aerobatic trainer for students in the Soviet DOSAAF training organisation, which trained civilian sport pilots and military pilots.  Currently the Yak-52 is used in the Fédération Aéronautique Internationale (FAI) World Aerobatic Yak 52 Competition, a popular powered aircraft one-design World Aerobatic Championship.

Design and development
A descendant of the single-seat competition aerobatic Yakovlev Yak-50, the all-metal Yak-52 is powered by a 268 kW (360 hp) Vedeneyev M14P nine-cylinder radial engine.

Since the aircraft was designed to serve as a military trainer, the development of the aircraft incorporates a number of features to be found on the early postwar fighters: notably the cockpit tandem layout (instrument panel, seat design, cockpit opening system), tail design, tricycle landing gear, fuselage mixed construction (monocoque with steel tube construction), inner flaps, controls position, access panels on sides of the fuselage, even the location of the radio antenna and overall dimensions of the airplane, which extensively match the Yakovlev Yak-17 UTI jet fighter trainer (NATO code name Magnet).

The aircraft has fuel and oil systems permitting inverted flight for as long as two minutes. The engine drives a two-bladed counter-clockwise rotating, variable pitch, wood and fiberglass laminate propeller.

At 998 kg (2,200 lb) empty weight, the Yak-52 is responsive and very capable as an aerobatic aircraft. Yet it is also easy to fly and land. It has been used in international aerobatic competition up to the Advanced level. It is stressed to +7 and –5 Gs, rolls (to the right) at well more than 180 degrees/second (measured up to 352 degrees/second to the right), and is capable of every manoeuvre in the Aresti catalog.

The Yak-52, like most Soviet military aircraft, was designed to operate in rugged environments with minimal maintenance. One of its key features, unusual in western aircraft, is its extensive pneumatic system. Engine starting, landing gear, flaps, and wheel brakes are all pneumatically actuated. Spherical storage bottles for air, replenished by an engine driven compressor, are situated behind the rear cockpit and contents displayed on the instrument panels. The operating pressure is between 10 and 50 bars (145 and 725 psi) and an emergency circuit is reserved for lowering the undercarriage if the normal supply is exhausted or the compressor fails. Additionally both main and reserve bottles can be charged from a port on the ground with compressed air, usually from a scuba type air bottle. The ground steering/braking arrangement, especially, takes some adjustment for flyers accustomed to hydraulics, because the aircraft uses differential braking controlled by rudder pedals and a hand-operated lever on the control stick.

The tricycle landing gear is retractable, but it remains partially exposed in the retracted position, affording both a useful level of drag in down manoeuvres and a measure of protection should the aircraft be forced to land "wheels up."

A number of "westernised" versions of the Yak-52 are now produced. The replacement of the existing Soviet avionics, fitting of a three-blade propeller and the M14PF 298 kW (400 hp) upgrade to the usual 360 hp M14P engine, and conversion to conventional "tail-dragger" landing gear (Yak-52TD) are some of the modifications made to the standard aircraft. There is also a factory-produced Yak-52TW tail-dragger version by Aerostar. The TW has an extra 120 L (32 US gal) of fuel capacity in two extra wing tanks, the M14PF engine designated & three blade propeller, an electric start, and modern instruments.

On April 16, 2004, a modernised variant Yak-52M was flown in Russia. It is fitted with modernised M-14Kh engine, three-blade propeller, and other modifications.

Variants

Yak-52
Two-seat primary trainer aircraft, powered by a 360-hp (268-kW) Vedeneyev M-14P nine-cylinder radial piston-engine.
Yak-52B
Two-seat light ground-attack aircraft, armed with two UB-32-57 rocket pods, each capable of carrying up to 32 air-to-ground S-5 rockets.
Yak-52M
2003 modernised version, powered by a Vedeneyev M-14Kh radial piston engine. It is fitted with a three-bladed propeller, new avionics and crew escape system.
Iak-52
Romanian designation of Yak-52 produced by Aerostar.
Aerostar Condor
Westernised version proposed by Aerostar, powered by Lycoming O-540 engine.
Iak-52W
Westernised version produced by Aerostar, powered by M-14P or M-14Kh engine, but with all western instruments installed.
Iak-52TW
Westernised version produced by Aerostar, powered by M-14P or M-14Kh engine and tail wheel instead of front wheel. This version has all-western instruments, deeply modernised wing that provide complete retraction of mainwheels and, also, enlargement of fuel tanks volume up to 280 L.

Military operators

Armenian Air Force - 16

DOSAAF (Belarus)

Bulgarian Air Force

Georgian Air Force

Latvian Air Force 

Lithuanian National Defence Volunteer Forces

Romanian Air Force - 12

DOSAAF Russia

DOSAAF Ukraine

DOSAAF
Soviet Air Force

Military of Turkmenistan

Vietnam People's Air Force - 36

Transnistria Air Force 0-2

Specifications (Iak 52 (Aerostar-built))

See also

References

 Lambert, Mark (ed.) Jane's All The World's Aircraft 1993-94. Coulsdon, UK:Jane's Data Division, 1993. .

External links

 Official YAK website for YAK-52M

1970s Soviet civil trainer aircraft
1970s Soviet military trainer aircraft
Yak-052
Aerobatic aircraft
Single-engined tractor aircraft
Aircraft first flown in 1976